Hexton Manor is a country house in Hexton, Hertfordshire that has been home to the Lautour family, descendants of the Dukes of Bouillon and Major Sir Patrick Ashley Cooper.

History
The Manor of Hexton started as part of the estate of St Albans Abbey until the dissolution of the monasteries in 1541 at which point it was given away from the church. The estate was owned by seventeen different families although it ended up with the Poyntz family under Newdigate Poyntz.

Hexton Manor started as a farmhouse in the 17th century, although was enlarged into a manor house in the 18th century. In 1820 the then owner, Joseph Andrew de Lautour and his wife Caroline Young de Lautour enlarged the house further. De Lautour inherited the property through his wife Caroline Young who was the daughter of William Young, the illegitimate child of Patrick Murray, 5th Lord Elibank who had owned the Hexton Estate priorly. The manor remained in the de Lautour family until it was purchased by George Hodgson, a rich textile merchant, in 1901 who enlarged and rebuilt it into its current form. Hodgson later sold the house to the businessman and politician Sir Patrick Ashley Cooper in 1918. Whilst owning the estate, Patrick Ashley Cooper served as High Sheriff of Hertfordshire and Deputy Lieutenant of Hertfordshire.

Hexton was initially put up for sale in 2018 via the estate agents, Savills for a guide price of £18.5 Million. It was again put on the market in 2022 again via Savills, this time for £15 Million and was later in the year listed on Knight Frank estate agents as well.

References

External links
 Hexton Manor Estate page
 Historic England page

Country houses in Hertfordshire
Grade II listed houses
Grade II listed buildings in Hertfordshire